Section 2 of the Constitution Act, 1867 is a repealed provision of the Constitution of Canada relating to the monarch of Canada.  It defined the term "Her Majesty the Queen" for the purposes of the Constitution Act, 1867.

The Constitution Act, 1867 is the constitutional statute which established Canada.  Originally named the British North America Act, 1867, the Act continues to be the foundational statute for the Constitution of Canada, although it has been amended many times since 1867.  It is now recognised as part of the supreme law of Canada.

Constitution Act, 1867

The Constitution Act, 1867 is part of the Constitution of Canada and thus part of the supreme law of Canada.  It was the product of extensive negotiations by the governments of the British North American provinces in the 1860s. The Act sets out the constitutional framework of Canada, including the structure of the federal government and the powers of the federal government and the provinces.  Originally enacted in 1867 by the British Parliament under the name the British North America Act, 1867, in 1982 the Act was brought under full Canadian control through the Patriation of the Constitution, and was renamed the Constitution Act, 1867.  Since Patriation, the Act can only be amended in Canada, under the amending formula set out in the Constitution Act, 1982.

Repealed text of section 2 

As originally enacted, section 2 read:

Section 2 was found in Part I of the Constitution Act, 1867, dealing with preliminary matters.

Repeal

Section 2 was repealed by the British Parliament in 1893, in the Statute Law Revision Act 1893, which repealed outdated provisions of British statutes which no longer had any effect.  The repeal may have been because the British Parliament had enacted a new Interpretation Act which had a general provision defining the monarch in legislation, and it was felt that there was no need for a specific provision in other legislation.

Purpose and interpretation
Section 2 defined the term "Her Majesty the Queen" as used in the Constitution Act, 1867.  Even though section 2 has been repealed, the courts have held that the references to the British monarch in the Preamble to the Constitution Act, 1867, as well as in section 9 of the Act, relating to the executive powers, establish that the British monarch is also the monarch of Canada.

References 

Constitution of Canada
Canadian Confederation
Federalism in Canada